Typee Mountain is a  summit in British Columbia, Canada.

Description

Typee Mountain is located in the Battle Range of the Selkirk Mountains. Precipitation runoff from the mountain drains north into Butters Creek and south into Houston Creek which are both tributaries of the Duncan River. Typee Mountain is more notable for its steep rise above local terrain than for its absolute elevation.

Etymology

The landform is named after Typee, which was Herman Melville's first novel published in 1846. In the novel, "Typee" refers to the valley of Taipivai, once known as Taipi. The name was submitted by author/mountaineer Robert Kruszyna in 1972 and follows the Herman Melville-associated naming theme of the area established in 1958–59 by the Sam Silverstein-Douglas Anger climbing party. The mountain's toponym was officially adopted on October 3, 1973, by the Geographical Names Board of Canada.

Climate

Based on the Köppen climate classification, Typee Mountain is located in a subarctic climate zone with cold, snowy winters, and mild summers. Winter temperatures can drop below −20 °C with wind chill factors below −30 °C. This climate supports the Pequod Glacier on the north slope of the peak.

See also
Outrigger Peak
Geography of British Columbia

References

External links
 Typee Mountain: Weather forecast

Two-thousanders of British Columbia
Selkirk Mountains
Kootenay Land District